Brachyponera obscurans is a species of ant of the subfamily Ponerinae. It is found from Borneo, Malaysia, New Guinea, Philippines, Mauritius, Sri Lanka, and China.

References

External links

 at antwiki.org
Animaldiversity.org

Ponerinae
Hymenoptera of Asia
Insects described in 1859